Yeouido Airport was an international airport in Yeouido, Seoul, South Korea. It operated as an international airport from 1929 to 1958, and thereafter as a military base until 1971.

History
The Imperial Japanese Army constructed an airstrip on Yeouido in 1916. At the time, the island was predominantly farmland but was also used as an Imperial Army training base.

Japanese authorities significantly upgraded the facility in 1929, along with a number of other airfields in Korea, to serve as stops for air service to Manchuria. Imperial Japanese Airways provided scheduled flights to Tokyo, Fukuoka, Mukden, Dalian, Hsinking and other destinations from the airport during the 1930s. The much larger Kimpo Airfield opened to Japanese military traffic in 1943, and Yeouido was thereafter officially known as Keijo No. 2 Airfield (京城第2飛行場).

After World War II, the airfield became a base of operations for Korean National Airlines (KNA/Koreanair), which operated international flights to Hong Kong and domestic flights to Pusan, Kangnung, Kwangju and Cheju. Northwest Orient Airlines operated Seoul-Tokyo flights in the 1950s, providing onward connections to North America.

The airport was prone to flooding that made it unusable during the summer rainy season. Gimpo International Airport took over Yeouido's commercial flights in 1958, and Seoul Air Base took over its military functions in 1971.

Former Airlines and Destinations (before 1958)

Imperial Japanese Airways operated until 1945 when operations ceased by US occupation. KNA operated from 1948 onwards. Northwest began service in 1947 when civil flights resumed in Japan.

References 

Defunct airports
Airports in South Korea
Airports established in 1916
Buildings and structures demolished in 1971
Korean War air bases
Yeouido
1971 disestablishments in South Korea